North Wingfield is a civil parish in the North East Derbyshire district of Derbyshire, England.  The parish contains eleven listed buildings that are recorded in the National Heritage List for England.  Of these, one is listed at Grade I, the highest of the three grades, and the others are at Grade II, the lowest grade.  The parish contains the large village of North Wingfield and the surrounding area.  The listed buildings consist of a church and associated structures, houses, a farmhouse, an old cross, a public house, and a range of stables.


Key

Buildings

References

Citations

Sources

 

Lists of listed buildings in Derbyshire